COSMO-SkyMed (COnstellation of small Satellites for the Mediterranean basin Observation) is an Earth-observation satellite space-based radar system funded by the Italian Ministry of Research and Ministry of Defence and conducted by the Italian Space Agency (ASI), intended for both military and civilian use. The prime contractor for the spacecraft was Thales Alenia Space. COSMO SkyMed is a constellation of four dual use Intelligence, surveillance, target acquisition, and reconnaissance (ISR) Earth observation satellites with a synthetic-aperture radar (SAR) as main payload, the result of the intuition of Giorgio Perrotta in the early nineties. The synthetic-aperture radar was developed starting in the late nineties with the SAR 2000 program funded by ASI.

The space segment of the system includes four identical medium-sized  satellites called COSMO-SkyMed (or COSMO) 1, 2, 3, 4, equipped with synthetic-aperture radar (SAR) sensors with global coverage of the planet. Observations of an area of interest can be repeated several times a day in all-weather conditions. The imagery is applied to defense and security assurance in Italy and other countries, seismic hazard analysis, environmental disaster monitoring, and agricultural mapping.

COSMO-SkyMed first generation 
The local time ascending node at the equator is 06:00. The operating life of each satellite is estimated to be 5 years. Each satellite repeats the same ground track every 16 days. They cross the equator at approximately 06:00 and 18:00 local-time each day and can image any point twice each day. The satellites are phased in the same orbital plane, with COSMO-SkyMed's 1, 3, and 2 at 90° intervals followed by COSMO-SkyMed 4 at 67.5° after COSMO-SkyMed 2. The offset of satellite 4 allows a one-day interferometry mode for elevation information. The Sun-synchronous orbit (SSO) is used due to power (Electrical Power Subsystem) and revisit time requirements.

The satellites' main components are:
 Two solar arrays for 3.8 kW at 42 V DC
 Stabilization, navigation and Global Positioning System (GPS) systems
 Synthetic-aperture radar (SAR) working in X-band
 300 Gbit on-board memory and 310 Mbit/s data-link with ground segments

The system is capable of both single- and dual-polarization collection. The center frequency is 9.6 GHz with a maximum radar bandwidth of 400 MHz.

List of launches 
United Launch Alliance provided launch services for the satellites with their Delta II 7420-10C launch vehicles from Vandenberg Air Force Base. Satellite processing for the first two satellites was handled by the Astrotech Space Operations subsidiary of SPACEHAB. The first satellite COSMO-1 (COSPAR 2007-023A) was launched at 02:34:00 UTC on 8 June 2007. COSMO-2 (COSPAR 2007-059A) was launched at 02:31:42 UTC on 9 December 2007, the launch having been delayed from 6 December 2007 due to bad weather, and problems with the rocket's cork insulation. COSMO-3 (COSPAR 2008-054A) launched at 02:28 UTC on 25 October 2008. COSMO-4 (COSPAR 2010-060A) launched on 6 November 2010, at 02:20 UTC.

Ground segment 
The ground segment of the system is composed of:
 Command Center:
  Centro Controllo e Pianificazione Missione del Fucino

 Tracking and data stations:
  Cordoba Station
  Kiruna Station

 User Ground Segments:
  Matera Civil User Ground Segment
  Pratica di Mare Defence User Ground Segment
  Defence User Ground Segment

The governments of Argentina and France are involved respectively in the civil and military segments of the system.

SAR capabilities 
The COSMO-SkyMed satellites have three basic types of imaging modes:  
 Spotlight, a high-resolution mode collected over a small area by steering the radar beam slightly fore-to-aft during the collection period
 Stripmap, a medium-resolution mode collected over long, continuous swaths in which the beam is pointed broadside to the satellite track
 ScanSAR, a low-resolution mode that creates extra-wide swaths by collecting short segments at different ranges and then mosaicking them together

There are two Spotlight modes: 
 SPOTLIGHT1, which is a military-only mode, and 
Spotlight polarization is limited to either HH or VV

There are two Stripmap modes:
The dual-polarization data can consist of any two polarizations (HH, VV, VH, HV), and it is non-coherent, as it is collected in "pulse groups" that alternate from one polarization to the other.

There are two ScanSAR modes:

The system is sized to collect up to 450 images per satellite per day.

Commercialization 
e-GEOS, S.p.A., a joint venture between European spaceflight services company Telespazio (80%) and the Italian Space Agency (ASI) (20%), has the exclusive worldwide commercial rights to sell COSMO-SkyMed data and products.

Flares 
The COSMO-SkyMed satellites are lesser-known deliverers of satellite flares, sometimes approaching magnitude −3. Flares come mainly from SAR-panels of the satellites. Although overshadowed by the Iridium satellites, the flares are often long-lasting, with the satellites traversing much of the sky at brighter-than-average magnitudes.

COSMO-SkyMed second generation (CSG) 
To replace the first COSMO-SkyMed constellation, the Italian Space Agency is developing the COSMO-SkyMed second generation constellation. The 2nd generation constellation has the same function of radar-based Earth observation with particular focus on the Mediterranean area as the 1st generation. Like the 1st generation, the 2nd generation also consists of 4 satellites, CSG-1, CSG-2, CSG-3 and CSG-4. The satellites are improved versions of the first generation satellites. Also the radar payload CSG-SAR (COSMO-SkyMed Second Generation Synthetic Aperture Radar) is an improved version of the first generation X-band SAR payload. Furthermore, the 2nd generation satellites will operate in the same orbit (indeed, in the same orbital plane) as the first generation satellites.

The contract for building two satellites was signed in September 2015. In December 2020, another two satellites were ordered. The satellites are built by Thales Alenia Space (the successor company of Alenia Spazio). They have a planned lifetime of 7 years. CSG-1 was launched on 18 December 2019 by Soyuz ST-A from Centre spatial Guyanais (CSG). CSG-2 was launched on 31 January 2022 by Falcon 9 Block 5 from Space Launch Complex 40 at Cape Canaveral Space Force Station, while the CSG-3 satellite is scheduled to be launched in 2024 on a Vega-C launch vehicle.

List of launches

See also 

 SAOCOM, two Argentine SAR-satellites that are part of the SIASGE constellation alongside COSMO-SkyMed.
 SAR Lupe, a system of five military SAR-satellites of Germany.

References

External links 

 COSMO-SkyMed Web Site
 COSMO-SkyMed Products 
 INNOVA Consorzio per l'Informatica e la Telematica s.r.l. – Italian SME with specific know-how and expertise with COSMO-SkyMed's HDF5 format
 Remote Monitoring of Migrants Vessels in the Mediterranean Sea (CeMiSS)

Spacecraft launched in 2019
Spacecraft launched in 2022
2019 in Italy
Satellites of Italy
Synthetic aperture radar satellites
Satellite constellations
Military equipment introduced in the 2000s